Tunisair Express is an airline based in Tunis, Tunisia that was founded on 1 August 1991. Formerly known as Tuninter and SevenAir, its parent company is the national carrier Tunisair. It operates to destinations within Tunisia as well as some services to Italy, France, and Malta.

History
From its founding in 1990 until 2000, Tunisair Express was known in French as Tuninter, and bore the Arabic name "Domestic Airline" (الخطوط الداخلية). Initially limited to domestic routes (it is still the only airline to fly internally within Tunisia), Tuninter, as it was then known, obtained permission to begin international operations in 2000. On 7 July 2007 (7/7/7), the airline was renamed "SevenAir" (Compagnie Aérienne Sevenair Tunisie, طيران السابع). SevenAir was owned by a relative of the wife of the former President Zine El-Abidine Ben Ali, and was renamed TunisAir Express following Ben Ali's departure from Tunisia on 14 January 2011. Tunisair Express transported a total of six million passengers between 1992 and 2008, carrying 300,000 passengers in 2008 alone.

In December 2015, it has been announced that Tunisair Express will be merged into Tunisair in the foreseeable future to achieve a better profitability.

Destinations 

As of June 2015, Tunisair Express operates scheduled passenger flights to the following destinations:

Fleet
, the Tunisair Express fleet consists of the following aircraft:

Accidents and incidents 
6 August 2005, Tuninter Flight 1153: a Tuninter ATR-72 crash-landed in the sea 18 miles off Palermo, Sicily while on a flight from the Italian town of Bari to Djerba in Tunisia. The aircraft was carrying 39 passengers and crew, 16 of whom died. Officials at Bari airport reported that most of the passengers were Italian tourists. The fuel indicator was reading incorrectly because it was designed to be fitted only in a smaller plane: the ATR42. Therefore, the crew did not detect that the aircraft was running low on fuel. The turboprop suffered fuel exhaustion and the ATR72 ditched off the Sicilian coast.  The airline was banned from flying into Italy for almost two years.

References

External links

Official website 
Archives of the Tuninter website 
Aviation Safety Network summary

Airlines of Tunisia
Airlines established in 1991
1991 establishments in Tunisia
Economy of Tunis